Ranaghat Uttar Purba Assembly constituency is an assembly constituency in Nadia district in the Indian state of West Bengal. It is reserved for scheduled castes.

Overview
As per orders of the Delimitation Commission, No. 89 Ranaghat Uttar Purba Assembly constituency (SC) is composed of the following: Aranghata, Bahirgachhi, Dutta Fulia, Jugalkishore, Kamalpur and Raghunathpur Hijuli II gram panchayats of Ranaghat II community development block, and Bagula I, Bagula II, Mamjoan, Ramnagar Bara Chupria I and Ramnagar Bara Chupria II gram panchayats of Hanskhali community development block.

Ranaghat Uttar Purba Assembly constituency (SC) is part of No. 13 Ranaghat (Lok Sabha constituency) (SC). Ranaghat East and West were earlier part of Nabadwip (Lok Sabha constituency).

Members of Legislative Assembly

Election results

2021

2016
In the 2016 election, Samir Poddar of Trinamool Congress defeated his nearest rival, Babusona Sarkar of CPI(M).

2011
In the 2011 election, Samir Poddar of Trinamool Congress defeated his nearest rival Archana Biswas of CPI(M).

 

.# Swing calculated on Congress+Trinamool Congress vote percentages taken together, as well as the CPI(M) vote percentage, in 2006  for the now defunct Hanskhali seat.

1977-2006
Till 2006, Ranaghat had two Vidhan Sabha constituencies Ranaghat East and Ranaghat West. Contests in most years were multi cornered but only winners and runners are being mentioned.

Ranaghat East
In the 2006 state assembly elections, Debendra Nath Biswas of CPI(M) won the Ranaghat East (SC) assembly constituency defeating his nearest rival Nilima Nag (Mallick) of Trinamool Congress. Asim Bala of CPI(M) defeated Dr. Ramendra Nath Biswas of Trinamool Congress in 2001. Binay Krishna Biswas of CPI(M) defeated Akhil Kumar Majumdar of Congress in 1996 and 1991, and Dr. Ramendra Nath Biswas of Congress in 1987. Satish Chandra Biswas of CPI(M) defeated Nitai Pada Sarkar, Independent, in 1982 and Sushil Kumar Ray of Congress in 1977.

Ranaghat West
In the 2006 state assembly elections, Aloke Kumar Das of CPI(M) won the Ranaghat West assembly seat defeating his nearest rival Shankar Singha of Congress. Shankar Singha of Congress defeated Jyotirmoyee Sikdar in 2001 and Sourendra Nath Nag of CPI(M) in 1996. Subhaas Basu of CPI(M) defeated  Naresh Chandra Chaki of Congress in 1991. Gour Chandra Kundu of CPI(M) defeated Saradindu Biswas of Congress in 1987, Benoy Chatterjee of Congress in 1982, and Naresh Chandra Chaki of Congress in 1977.

1967-1972

Ranaghat East
Nitaipada Sarkar of CPI won in 1972. Naresh Chandra Biswas of CPI(M) won in 1971. Nitai Pada Sarkar of CPI won in 1969 and 1967.

Ranaghat West
Naresh Chandra Chaki of Congress won in 1972. Gour Chandra Kundu of CPI(M) 1971 and 1969. Benoy Kumar Chatterjee of Congress won in 1967.

1951-1962 Ranaghat
In 1962 and 1957, there was a single seat for Ranaghat.  Gour Chandra Kundu of CPI won in 1962. Benoy Kumar Chatterjee of Congress won in 1957. In independent India's first election in 1951, Ranaghat was a joint seat. Bijoy Krishna Sarkar and Keshab Chandra Mitra won the Ranaghat seat.

References

Assembly constituencies of West Bengal
Politics of Nadia district